"Murn After Reading" is the sixth episode of the American superhero television series Peacemaker, a spin-off from the 2021 film The Suicide Squad. The episode was written and directed by series creator James Gunn. It originally aired on HBO Max on February 3, 2022.

The series is set after the events of The Suicide Squad, and follows Christopher Smith / Peacemaker. Smith returns to his home but is forced to work with A.R.G.U.S. agents on a classified operation only known as "Project Butterfly". Smith also has to deal with his personal demons, including feeling haunted by memories of people he killed for "peace", as well as reconnecting with his estranged father. In the episode, Auggie is released from prison, while the police start looking for Smith. Meanwhile, Murn reveals his true nature to the team.

The episode received critical acclaim, with critics praising the revelations, character development, performances and Gunn's directing.

Plot
As Murn tries to calm Adebayo, Harcourt arrives and reveals her knowledge of Murn's identity. Murn explains that the Butterflies came from a dying planet, and that the Goff Butterfly planned to conquer Earth. Murn resisted the idea and took the body of the real Murn as a host. Economos is also aware of Murn's identity, but they keep it a secret from Waller. Murn wants to hurry with their plan before the Butterflies move the "cow".

Smith attends a school to talk about his "superhero" days, although he feels uneasy when he is questioned about his "origin story". He returns home, where he and Chase see that the Goff Butterfly is trying to communicate with them. Meanwhile, Auggie is released from prison, with Song and Fitzgibbon having obtained an arrest warrant for Smith, despite the objections of Locke. As he is picked up, Auggie states he will kill Smith.

Murn fails to warn Smith in time and the police arrives at his trailer home. Smith and Chase take the Goff Butterfly and Eagly and hide on the rooftop while the police discover the planted diary at his trailer home. Smith and Chase try to move through the trees but Chase accidentally slips, shattering the jar holding the Goff Butterfly. Song finds them but the Butterfly enters her body just as more officers arrive. Smith and Chase escape through the woods and are intercepted by Locke, who kills other officers tailing the duo, gives them a car to escape, lies to Fitzgibbon about their escape, and retrieves the fake diary. The possessed Song, acting erratically, leaves the scene.

Tensions arise in the team as Smith complains about the fake diary and how Locke killed the officers, but Adebayo does not reveal her involvement. Economos traces the Butterflies' activities to Coverdale Ranch, where they believe the Butterflies are using a "cow" to mass-produce the amber fluid. That night, Song summons more of the Butterflies and guides them through the police station, possessing everyone including Fitzgibbon and Locke. At the same time, Auggie and his followers meet at his house, where he dons his White Dragon suit. Smith meets with Harcourt to express his discomfort with his new contract killing, and Harcourt states she does not view him as a bad person. After she leaves, Chase visits Smith and shows him a television report where the possessed Locke incriminates Smith with the fake diary.

Production

Development
In January 2021, James Gunn confirmed that the episode's title would be "Murn After Reading".

Writing
Before the episode aired, James Gunn teased the level of violence in the episode, "There was one moment they were afraid of us showing that comes in Episode 6 that I pretty much insisted on keeping."

On the concept of Auggie using the "White Dragon" suit, Gunn said, "He is really a piece of shit. It's a real thing in our world, it's a real thing in our life. And to, kind of, do these sort of McDonald's versions of white supremacy that happen in these types of tales seems inauthentic to me. So I decided to just let him be what he is, which is a racist piece of shit." Actor Robert Patrick commented, "That was really, really exciting. I have to be honest with you, to be fit with a suit and to realise that I was going to be a supervillain was just, I was so excited for that. [...] And, you know, the suits are not cheap, they're expensive, and it was one of the things I sweated [about] while we were doing the production was, you know, 'I can't get fat, I can't gain weight.'"

Filming
While the episode was the sixth to air, it was actually the final episode to be filmed. The reasoning was that Gunn originally didn't plan to direct the episode, but settled on to do it, deeming it his favorite episode.

Reception

Critical reviews
"Murn After Reading" received critical acclaim. Samantha Nelson of IGN gave the episode an "amazing" 9 out of 10 rating and wrote in his verdict, "Project Butterfly experiences multiple major setbacks in a dramatic episode of Peacemaker filled with great plot twists. The actors are really showing their strengths in some deeply emotional scenes. Music and action pair together perfectly to deliver big thrills and set the stakes for the show's final conflicts."

Jarrod Jones of The A.V. Club gave the episode an "A" grade and wrote, "'Murn After Reading' marks James Gunn's return to the series as director after passing the baton to Jody Hill and Rosemary Rodriguez for the last two episodes. The result is the most cinematic installment of Peacemaker yet." Alec Bojalad of Den of Geek gave the episode a 4 star rating out of 5 and wrote, "Still, Gunn and the production team are so completely in control of the storytelling style that they've perfected that it seems impossible for the last quarter of this experience to not be fun. If nothing else, Vigilante might get to the bottom of whether Goff's butterfly likes teal."

Accolades
TVLine named Chukwudi Iwuji as an honorable mention as the "Performer of the Week" for the week of February 5, 2022, for his performance in the episode. The site wrote, "When Peacemakers Adebayo realized that Murn was a Butterfly, one thing we did not expect to come out of the ensuing confrontation was such a moving performance by Chukwudi Iwuji. After Murn explained how the rest of his extraterrestrial kind had decided to take over humans in positions of power, Adebayo pointed out that he had stolen a life, as well. 'I needed to stop them!', Murn shot back. 'So I inhabited the worst person I could find', a former mercenary. 'This man, Leota... he's a murderer', he added, Iwiji's eyes registering both a certain shame and begging for understanding. 'He could have changed, and I took that from him... and every day I dread waking up to his memories.' It was Iwuji's most emotional work thus far (and by a long shot, as taciturn Murn), and it was worth the wait."

References

External links
 

Peacemaker (TV series) episodes
2022 American television episodes
Television episodes directed by James Gunn
Television episodes written by James Gunn